Criminal Talent is a 1988 Soviet two-part television crime drama feature film, a screen version of the same story by Stanislav Rodionov.

Plot 
In Leningrad, there are a number of similar crimes associated with fraud and theft. Men get acquainted with a girl in a restaurant, drink a few glasses of alcohol and come to their senses in a completely different place, without money in their pockets. Investigator Sergei Ryabinin and police captain Vadim Petelnikov are beginning to hunt for the crooks, but it soon becomes clear that there is only one girl, a real "criminal talent". When following the alleged criminal, Peltelnikov himself becomes her victim. In the end he succeeds in tracking down the thief, but she brazenly runs right out from under the nose of the unlucky police officers.

Soon again unusual crimes begin in the city. On behalf of the victims to their relatives' addresses, "tragic" telegrams arrive with the request to send money, and nobody can explain how the criminals manage to get the confidential information. Investigator Ryabinin is sure that this is the tricks of the same girl whom he is hunting. Ryabinin unravels the criminal's secret, arranges a trap for her, and finally, the fraudster Alexandra Rukoyatkina is caught.

But now the most difficult part begins. The "criminal talent" is imprisoned, but the evidence against her is extremely unconvincing, and the court will probably not take it into account. The investigator has a difficult psychological duel, the result of which should be a candid confession of the young criminal.

Cast 
 Aleksei Zharkov as Sergey Ryabinin, investigator
 Alexandra Zakharova as Alexandra Rukoyatkina, swindler
 Igor Nefyodov as Vadim Petelnikov, police captain
 Vladimir Korenev  as Sergey Kurikin, victim
 Vladimir Simonov as  Victor Kaplichenkov, victim
 Lyudmila Davydova as Lyudmila Afanasyevna, the commandant of the hostel
 Yanislav Levinzon as  tailor, victim
 Oleg Filimonov as waiter
 Oleg Shkolnik as the seller in the furniture store
 Svetlana Fabrikant as girl at a restaurant
 Alla Budnitskaya as Ustyuzhanina, an ambulance doctor
 Yuriy Dubrovin as educator Snegirev nicknamed Karmazin
 Anna Nazareva as Alexandra Rukoyatkina's friend
 Viktor Pavlovsky as  Ivan Savelovich, police major in the sobering-up station
 Yevgeniy Ganelin as police sergeant
 Elena Borzunova as  Masha Gvozdikina, secretary of the prosecutor's office

References

External links
 

Soviet television films
Soviet crime drama films
Odesa Film Studio films
1988 crime drama films
1988 films